Singularity is the second studio album by Australian heavy metal band Northlane. It was released on 22 March 2013 through UNFD and Distort. This is the last album to feature vocalist Adrian Fitipaldes before his departure in September 2014. It was produced by Will Putney and recorded at The Machine Shop in Belleville.

In 2014, a deluxe edition of Singularity was released, which contains instrumental versions of all songs.

At the J Awards of 2013, the album was nominated for Australian Album of the Year.

Background
After much speculation over the ambiguous viral campaign centered on singularity2013.com, many news sites were reporting the possibility of the music group We Are Unified running a new roster based festival. The website functioned simply as a countdown but had many acts signed to We Are Unified posting online about it. When the countdown hit midnight on the morning of 21 February 2013, it was revealed that Singularity was in fact the title of the next album from the Sydney band.

The viral campaign created such hype for the project that fans were cracking the code of track listings hidden in a series of invisible cubes placed around the singularity2013.com website and decoding details on the LP written in binary code on a magazine advert.

Critical reception

The album has received positive reviews from critics. Hannah Gillicker from Already Heard gave the album 4 out of 5, saying: "Northlane have confirmed at least one thing with Singularity and that's that they know how to craft a bloody good record. Totalling at 10 tracks, there's little to criticise here and the band are definitely playing their cards right." KillYourStereo gave it 85 out of 100 and said: "In a harsh manner of speaking, Singularity isn't necessarily ground breaking, but the album takes a style with current and strong appeal and puts its own spin on things. The charm here is that Northlane promote positivity and ambition. They are doing something they love and the results match. This is an inspiring record in so many ways. Musically evolved and emotionally diverse." Rock Sound rated the album 8 out of 10 and said: "With Singularity, Northlane have created a familiar but also fresh and engrossing record, showcasing true progress and growth as a band. At times it's a tad repetitive, but that only serves to stop the album being something truly special."

Track listing

Personnel
Credits for Singularity adapted from AllMusic.

Northlane
 Adrian Fitipaldes – lead vocals, composition, lyrics
 Jon Deiley – lead guitar, composition
 Josh Smith – rhythm guitar
 Alex Milovic – bass
 Nic Pettersen – drums, percussion

Additional musicians
 Drew York of Stray from the Path – guest vocals on track 8, "Masquerade"
 Terence McKenna – spoken word on track 9, "Singularity"

Additional personnel
 Will Putney – engineering, mastering, mixing, production
 Randy Leboeuf – engineering
 Zakk Cervini and Alberto de Icaza – editing
 Luke Logemann – A&R
 Pat Fox – art direction, design
 Ben Clement – photography

Charts

References

External links
Singularity Official Website

2013 albums
Northlane albums
Distort Entertainment albums
Rise Records albums
UNFD albums
Albums produced by Will Putney